Maurice Berkeley (c. 15761617) was an English landowner and gentleman who sat in the House of Commons at various times between 1597 and 1614.

Family
Maurice Berkeley was the eldest son of Sir Henry Berkeley (d.1601) of Bruton Abbey, Somerset, and Margaret Lygon (d. 1616), widow of Sir Thomas Russell (d. 1574) of Strensham, Worcestershire, and a daughter of William Lygon (d. 29 September 1567), esquire, of Madresfield Court, Worcestershire, by Eleanor Dennis. By his mother's marriage to Sir Henry Berkeley, Maurice Berkeley had two brothers of the whole blood, Henry Berkeley and Edward Berkeley, and by her first marriage to Sir Thomas Russell, Maurice Berkeley had a half-brother, Thomas Russell (1570-1634) of Strensham, who married firstly Katherine Bampfield (d. before 1599) and secondly, Anne St. Leger, widow of Thomas Digges, and who in 1616 was overseer of the will of William Shakespeare.

Career
On 13 February 1590 Berkeley matriculated at Queen's College, Oxford, at the age of thirteen, together with his eleven-year-old brother, Henry. His half-brother, Thomas Russell, was also at Queen's College at the time, in his second year.  Berkeley graduated BA on 14 February 1593, and was admitted to the Middle Temple in 1594.

In the 1590s, acrimonious conflicts between Sir Henry Berkeley's father and Henry Herbert, 2nd Earl of Pembroke, required the intervention of the Queen and the Star Chamber; however, Maurice Berkeley appears to have managed to remain uninvolved in his father's long-standing quarrels with Pembroke.

Berkeley was with Essex in the expedition to Cadiz in 1596, and in January 1598 was to have accompanied his cousin, Sir Robert Cecil, to France, although it is unclear whether he did travel to the continent at that time. In August of that year he requested a military appointment. In 1601 he succeeded his father.

In 1597, Berkeley was elected a Member of Parliament for Truro. He was elected as one of the members for  Somerset in 1601 and for Minehead in 1604. In 1614 he was re-elected as a knight of the shire for Somerset.

Marriage
Berkeley married Elizabeth Killigrew, the eldest daughter of  Sir William Killigrew (died 1622) of Hanworth, Middlesex, from an ancient Cornish family, a courtier to Queen Elizabeth I and to King James I, whom he served as Groom of the Privy Chamber. According to Bellany, William Killigrew, and his brother, Henry Killigrew, 'made their fortunes at Elizabeth I's court'. William Killigrew was a diplomatic courier, a Groom of the Privy Chamber by 1576, and Treasurer of the Chamber in 1595. He held various offices in Cornwall and Devon, was a member of Parliament, was knighted by King James I at Theobalds on 7 May 1603, and in 1605-8 was Chamberlain of the Exchequer. By Elizabeth Killigrew Sir Maurice Berkeley had five sons and two daughters:
Charles Berkeley, 2nd Viscount Fitzhardinge 
Henry Berkeley 
Maurice Berkeley 
Sir William Berkeley 
John Berkeley, 1st Baron Berkeley of Stratton
Margaret Berkeley
Jane Berkeley

Death
Sir Maurice Berkeley's mother died in the winter of 1616, leaving him her household goods at Bruton and the wedding ring 'which I had of his father, my late husband, Sir Henry Barkley, knight', and leaving his half-brother, Thomas Russell, a basin and ewer of silver 'which was his father's, Sir Thomas Russell, deceased'. Berkeley survived his mother by only a few months. He made his will on 26 April 1617, and died on 11 May, purportedly ‘far indebted’. He left Bruton to his eldest son, Charles. His son William Berkeley was later Governor of Virginia.

Footnotes

References

External links
Pedigree of Berkeley
Sir Maurice Berkeley (c.1579-1617), History of Parliament
Sir William Killigrew (d.1622), History of Parliament

 
 

 

1570s births
1617 deaths
Members of the Parliament of England for Truro
Members of the Middle Temple
English MPs 1597–1598
English MPs 1601
English MPs 1604–1611
English MPs 1614
People from Bruton
Politicians from Somerset
Members of the Parliament of England for Minehead